Bichak is a stuffed baked or fried pastry that comes in different forms (round, triangle, quadrangle) appetizer or meal similar to a turnover, served  in Central Asia cuisines including Uzbek cuisine, Tajik cuisine, Afghan cuisine, and Middle Eastern cuisine, most notably in Moroccan cuisine. It is often served during tea or coffee hour. Bichak can be stuffed with pumpkin, veggies and jam for a sweet taste, or meat and cheese for a savory addition to a lunch.  Bichak are also popular because they can be prepared in large quantities.
They are traditional for Rosh Hashanah and Sukkot. For kosher dairy meals, bichak stuffed with pumpkin or cheese are served with yogurt or sour cream.

See also
 List of Middle Eastern dishes
 Uzbek cuisine
 Jewish cuisine
 Israeli cuisine
 North African cuisine
 Middle Eastern cuisine
 Samosa
 List of African dishes
 List of hors d'oeuvre
 List of stuffed dishes

References

Arab cuisine
Middle Eastern cuisine
Appetizers
Jewish cuisine
Sephardi Jewish cuisine
Stuffed dishes
Bukharan Jews
Uzbekistani cuisine
North African cuisine